Desbruyeresia spinosa is a species of sea snail, a marine gastropod mollusk in the family Provannidae.

Description

Distribution

References

 Desbruyères, D., M. Segonzac & M. Bright (eds.). 2006. Handbook of Deep-sea Hydrothermal Vent Fauna. Second Edition Denisia 18: 1–544. (Copepods 316-355)(Polychaeta 183-296)

spinosa
Gastropods described in 1993